Bigger may refer to:

 Bigger (film), a 2018 film about bodybuilders Joe Weider and Ben Weider
 Bigger (TV series), an American comedy series streaming on BET+
 Bigger Township, Jennings County, Indiana, United States

People
 John Bigger (died 1840), Ohio legislator and father of Samuel
 Samuel Bigger (1802–1846), Governor of Indiana
 Edward Coey Bigger (1861–1942), Irish politician and physician
 Francis Joseph Bigger (1863–1926), Irish antiquarian
 Joseph Warwick Bigger (1891–1951), Irish politician and academic
 Brian Bigger (born 1958), Canadian politician

Music
 "Bigger" (Backstreet Boys song), 2009
 "Bigger" (Justin Bieber song), 2009
 "Bigger" (Beyoncé song), 2019
 "Bigger" (Stan Walker song), 2020
 Bigger (album), a 2018 album by Sugarland

See also
 Biggar (disambiguation)
 Bigga (disambiguation)